In the Netherlands, the municipal council (Dutch: gemeenteraad) is the elected assembly of the municipality. Its main role is laying down the guidelines for the policy of the municipal executive and exercising control over its execution by the mayor and aldermen.

The municipal councils range in size from nine to 45 seats (as in the Amsterdam the capitalcity), depending on the municipality's population, and are elected by the population every four years. In many municipalities all major political parties contest in the election in addition to local parties. In most major, urban municipalities, all major parties are represented in the municipal council, while in smaller and more rural municipalities, only the largest parties and a local party have seats in the municipal council.

Right to elect council members and to run for council 

All Dutch citizens, and all foreigners who live in the Netherlands for at least four years in a municipality, have the right to vote and almost all citizens can be elected. Ministers and state secretaries in the national government are barred from standing in elections as well as mayors and civil servants employed by the municipality. After the elections the parties in the states elect the aldermen.

Greffier 
The municipal council is supported by its own civil service headed by the council's greffier (raadsgriffier).

General council members 

Members of the council are not paid as full-time politicians; instead, most of them have day job. As in most legislatures, the members of municipal council work in both political groups and policy area related committees.

Mayor 

The mayor chairs the meetings of the council but does not have voting rights.

Duoraadsslids 

A duoraadslid ("dual municipal councillor"; plural duoraadsleden) is a political position in the municipal councils of some municipalities. The duoraadslid is a representative of a political party who is not elected into a municipal council. A duoraadslid has the right to speak in the meetings of committees of the municipal council and in the preparatory part of council meetings. This allows small groups in a municipal council to spread the duties of membership of the municipal council among more people. It is often a requirement that the duoraadslid was on the party list for the election. Research at Erasmus University indicated that duoraadsleden increase participation of young politicians in municipal politics.

References

Government of the Netherlands
City councils
Local government in the Netherlands